Woodlawn was a large plantation of  located in northern Leon County, Florida, United States established by Dr. Griffin Holland in 1834. Holland was married in 1839 to Margaret Whitaker.

Property history
In 1826, John Phinzy of Georgia purchased Lot 4 of Section 22, Township 3 North, Range 1 East. In 1827, Samuel Bryan purchased Lot 1, Section 22 and Island 3 on Lake Iamonia within Section 22.

In 1834, Dr. Griffin W. Holland, of Virginia purchased Lots 2 and 3 of Section 22, Township 3 North, Range 1 East naming the property Woodlawn.

Location
Woodlawn would now be a good portion of County Road 12, Gallen Drive, Henry Beadel Drive including Tall Timbers Research Station, Iamonia Landing Road including the small African-American neighborhoods located on Waterfront Drive, Pelican Lane, Seagull Lane, and Annabelle Lane.

Plantation statistics

The Leon County Florida 1860 Agricultural Census shows that Woodlawn had the following:
 Improved Land: 
 Unimproved Land: 
 Cash value of plantation: $30,000
 Cash value of farm implements/machinery: $1200
 Cash value of farm animals: $7000
 Number of slaves: 95
 Bushels of corn: 7000
 Bales of cotton: 225

The owner
G.W. Holland was a signee to the Southern Rights Association of Centreville District on secession from the Union for the protection of Southern interests and the vindication of Southern rights to preserve and protect the Constitution in its purity as the basis of Federal compact, and the only foundation on which the Union of the States was made, or on which that Union should be preserved.

Purchase of Woodlawn
Dr. Holland lived on the property until about 1844. Having fallen on hard times during and post-Civil War, Holland sold the land to Alexander Mosely in 1871 for $6,760.47. Mosely was a 30-year-old farmer and Civil War veteran from Leon County and had a wife, Mary L. Moseley and a young son, William. During his 9 years on Woodlawn, Mosely would also become Leon County Sheriff. Mosely's new occupation led to the Mosely's selling Woodlawn and moving to Tallahassee.

In 1880 Mosely sold Woodlawn to Eugene H. Smith, a storekeeper from Thomasville, Georgia for $4000. Smith then renamed the property Hickory Hill. The Smiths lived at Hickory Hill for 15 years before Mrs. Eugene Smith sold the property.

In 1895 Hickory Hill was purchased for $8000 by Edward Beadle of New York City and became a quail hunting plantation called Tall Timbers Plantation. It would be passed down to Beadle's nephew and then later become the property of Tall Timbers Research Station and Land Conservancy.

References

1834 establishments in Florida Territory
Plantations in Leon County, Florida
Cotton plantations in Florida